was founded in 1918 as Shinano Spun Silk Spinning Co., Ltd. to manufacture spun silk yarn, which at that time was one of the most high-tech industries in the world. As the years passed, the company expanded to other industrial markets while maintaining its silk operations. In 1962 the company established an Electrical Department and, in 1971 the company introduced a fan motor for air conditioning machines. The company started the production of tape decks in 1972 and, in 1973, the company introduced a gear motor for copying machines and changed the company name to Shinano Kenshi Co., Ltd.

In 1985 Hanaoka Hosei Co., Ltd., a subsidiary of Shinano Kenshi, changed its name to Texel Corporation. It developed the Plextor brand in 1993.

Products

Precision Electric Motor
Industrial System Equipment(Image/High speed camera/Printer/Audio)
Welfare & Life Assist equipment
Spun Silk Yarn

External links
 Shinano Kenshi
 PLEXLOGGER

Electronics companies of Japan
Companies based in Nagano Prefecture
Electronics companies established in 1918
Japanese brands